Magnús Orri Schram (born 23 April 1972 in Reykjavík) is an Icelandic politician.

See also
Politics of Iceland

External links
 Non auto-biography of Magnús Orri Schram on the parliament website 

Magnus Orri Schram
Living people
1972 births
Politicians from Reykjavík
University of Iceland alumni
21st-century Icelandic politicians